Ormstown is a municipality in Quebec, Canada, which is situated on the Chateauguay River in the heart of the Chateauguay Valley. It is approximately one hour southwest of Montreal and 20 minutes north of New York State in the United States. The population as of the Canada 2011 Census was 3,595 of which Francophones comprise about 65%.

Ormstown has two elementary schools, one high school (Chateauguay Valley Regional), and two adult education facilities, several restaurants and churches. Ormstown is also well known for its numerous antique dealers and unique gift shops. There is a park north of the centre of town which is home to Ormstown Beach, an urban legend created and memorialized in the 1970s with "I've been to Ormstown Beach" bumper stickers. It is a popular summer activity to cycle along the Chateauguay River. The town has traces of an old dam, which was once the source of power for the mill. People living outside the town only gained access to electricity following World War II.

History
In the 1950s, Ormstown became the site of a significant microwave radio relay station, part of the Trans Canada Telephone System. Initially, the system passed through the major cities of Canada via towers located on top of downtown telephone buildings. Subsequently, concerns were expressed that a disaster affecting any of those city cores, such as a war or uprising, would result in an interruption of the continuity of the transcontinental communications system. The solution was to locate a "bypass" microwave site outside each of those cities with links to the east and west, as well as a short link into the city. The Ormstown facility was the bypass point for Montreal, but had further significance as it also included a link to the AT&T Long Lines TD2 microwave system in the United States.

In 2000, the town merged with the surrounding parish of St-Malachie d'Ormstown to form the Municipality of Ormstown.

Geography

Communities
The following locations reside within the municipality's boundaries:
Tatehurst – a hamlet located in the northern portion along Route 201.

Lakes & Rivers
The following waterways pass through or are situated within the municipality's boundaries:
Étang Greig (Greig Pond) – a pond in the eastern portion.
Rivière aux Outardes (Outardes River) (Mouth ) – feeds into the Chateauguay River (la Rivière Chateauguay).
Rivière aux Outardes Est (East Outardes River) (Mouth ) – feeds into Rivière aux Outardes.
Chateauguay River – flows west to east through the municipality.

Demographics

Population

Language

Attractions

Expo Ormstown
One of the town's main attractions is the Expo Ormstown—formally known as the Ormstown Fair—which was started in 1910.  It is held annually during the second week of June, making it Quebec's earliest spring fair. Several competitions take place at the fair: farm animals, crafts, horticulture and baked goods are evaluated by judges and can be viewed by fair goers.  Other competitions include a tractor pull, demolition derby, and equestrian events.  Additionally, there are carnival rides, arcades, a petting zoo, and live musical performances. The Ormstown fair attracts people from all surrounding areas.

Allan's Corners
Located near Ormstown, in the hamlet of Allan's Corners, is the site of the Battle of the Chateauguay, where  on October 26, 1813 Canadian and Native forces fought and repelled an invading American force that was planning to attack Montreal during the War of 1812. The site is a National Historic Site of Canada, and there is a Parks Canada museum near the site of the battle.

Government
Jacques Lapierre was elected to fill the post of mayor on November 1, 2009, replacing interim mayor Luc Lavigueur. Lavigueur took over the post after former mayor John McCaig resigned for health reasons.

Infrastructure

Transportation
exo du Haut-Saint-Laurent formerly provided commuter and local bus services, but these have been replaced by services provided by the Haut-Saint-Laurent Regional County Municipality.

See also
 Le Haut-Saint-Laurent Regional County Municipality
 Chateauguay River
 Rivière aux Outardes (Chateauguay River)
 Rivière aux Outardes Est
 List of municipalities in Quebec
 Vladimir Katriuk

References

External links

 Battle of the Châteauguay National Historic Site of Canada
 Expo Ormstown

Municipalities in Quebec
Incorporated places in Le Haut-Saint-Laurent Regional County Municipality